Suhr Chae-yeon (born January 20, 1996 in Seoul, South Korea) is a South Korean figure skater. She competed in the free skate at the 2012 Four Continents Championships in Colorado Springs, Colorado.

Programs

Competitive highlights

References

External links 
 

South Korean female single skaters
1996 births
Living people
Figure skaters from Seoul